The Ivey Awards were an annual award show, celebrating Twin Cities (Minneapolis/Saint Paul, Minnesota) professional theater. Established in 2004, the non-nomination based awards served to recognize outstanding achievements within the past theater season in direction, performance, design, etc. The awards were founded by Scott Mayer and administered by a panel of local theater professionals and theater patrons. The Iveys ceased in 2018 due to lack of funding.

The Iveys were held each year in September at the historic State Theater, in the theater district of Minneapolis.

About the Award Ceremony
The IVEY awards were created in 2004  in an effort to acknowledge the ever-growing Twin Cities theater community, while providing theater professionals and theater-goers an "annual celebration and recognition ceremony," honoring the previous year's theater season and theatrical accomplishments. The evening of entertainment and awards consists of performances from the past year of theater (ranging from musical theater, dance, scenes), award presentation, and lifetime achievement recognition. Typically, the award presenters, entertainment and hosts are local theater professionals and celebrities. However, the occasional nationally known celebrity, having recent local theatrical experience, has hosted the event and/or presented an award.

Details of the IVEY Awards
Because of the celebratory nature of the IVEY awards, there is not a pre-determined number of awards nor pre-existing categories. Furthermore, the awards are not meant to be a competition, thus there are no nominees.

However, there are three general categories included in the recognition ceremony:
 Awards for lifetimes achievement and an emerging artist(determined by representatives of all theater organizations participating in the project)
 Awards for theater highlights (determined by a group of over 100 volunteer evaluators and the theater-going public)
 Recognition for work in the areas of production, design, direction, performance, and special citations (determined by the group of volunteer evaluators and theater-going public)

Eligibility
Note: all information taken from IVEY Theater Eligibility Requirements 

Organizations that elect to participate in the project and be considered for Ivey Awards recognition must represent themselves as a professional theater organization.

Professional theater organizations that wish to participate or be considered for an award must:
 Be registered in the State of Minnesota as a 501(c)(3) organization or a for-profit business.
 Have been producing work and in existence for at least one year.
 Compensate their artists and staff on a regular basis.
 Be based in and produce in the Twin Cities’ seven county metropolitan area.
 Provide between six and ten complimentary tickets for each production to be evaluated that are valid for performance dates selected by the assigned evaluators.

All work eligible for an award must: 
 Be produced by an eligible theater organization.
 Be scripted.
 Have a run of at least ten days or over two weekends.

The awards will not cover touring theater or college and university theater.

Recognition Evaluation Process
The process of evaluation was developed to include many theater perspectives. The opinions of a group of 100 evaluators, who represent many aspects of the theater audience (theater professionals [actors, directors, designers], general theater-goers, donors, etc.), attend performances and evaluate certain aspects of each performance. These opinions are collected and further evaluated by the IVEY Award panel, and awards are then decided upon.

Furthermore, all opinions from any audience member can contribute to the evaluation process by submittal to the IVEY Award panel, via the official website.

Awards and recipients

2005

2006

Productions
 Sez She, emotional impact—Illusion Theater
 The Talk: An Intercourse of Coming of Age, unique concept -- Youth Performance Company
 I Am Anne Frank, direction (Ben Krywoscz) and musical direction (Mindy Eschedor) -- Nautilus Music Theater

Individuals
 Gerry Giouard, choreography -- Crimes and Whispers, Off Leash Area
 Barry Kornhauser, playwriting -- Reeling, Children's Theatre Company
 Jim Lichtsheidl, creation -- Knock, Theatre Latte Da
 Joel Sass, set design -- Last of the Boys, Jungle Theater

Actor Honorees
 Bradley Greenwald -- I Am My Own Wife, Jungle Theater
 Dean Holt -- Reeling, Children's Theatre Company

Emerging Artist Award
Christiana Clark, performer

Lifetime Achievement Award
Jack Reuler, Artistic Director

2007

Productions
 Don Giovanni, musical direction and performances—Theatre de la Jeune Lune
 Love, Janis, musical direction and performances -- Ordway Center for the Performing Arts
 Messy Utopia, innovative concept and idea -- Mixed Blood Theatre

Individual Honorees
 John Arnone, scenic design -- Private Lives, Guthrie Theater
 Michael Matthew Ferrell, choreography—Disney's High School Musical, Children's Theatre Company
 Mike Hallenbeck, sound design -- Kid-Simple and Hunger, Emigrant Theater

Actor Honorees
 Thomas W. Jones, II -- Yellowman, Mixed Blood Theatre
 Kris Nelson -- Wellstone!, History Theatre
 Edward Williams, Jr. -- Kiss of the Spider Woman, Minneapolis Musical Theater
 Sally Wingert -- Woman Before a Glass, Minnesota Jewish Theatre

Emerging Artist Award
Kate Sutton-Johnson, scenic designer

Lifetime Achievement Award
Sheila Livingston

2008

Productions
 Broken Brain Summit, innovative concept and idea—Interact Center
 Night Mother, overall excellence -- Workhouse Theatre Company
 Cabaret, costume design, scenic design & choreography—Ordway Center for the Performing Arts
 The Pillowman, emotional impact—Frank Theatre
 A Prelude to Faust, overall excellence—Open Eye Figure Theatre

Individual Honorees
 Tamara Kangas, choreography -- 42nd Street, Chanhassen Dinner Theatres

Actor Honorees
 Kate Eifrig -- 9 Parts of Desire, Guthrie Theater
 Jairus Abts -- Hedwig and the Angry Inch, Jungle Theater
 James A. Williams -- Fences, Penumbra Theatre Company
 Garry Geiken, Katie Guentzel, John Middleton, Carolyn Pool, Matt Rein, Alan Sorenson -- Orson's Shadow, Gremlin Theatre

Emerging Artist Award
Matthew Amendt, playwright and performer

Lifetime Achievement Award
Don Stoltz

2009

Productions
 Little Rock, 1957, Youth Performance Company
 Tyrone & Ralph, History Theatre
 Old Wicked Songs, Theatre Latte Da

Individual Honorees
 Greg Banks, Direction -- Romeo and Juliet, by the Children's Theatre Company
 Chris Griffith, Props Puppet Design -- Herschel and the Hanukkah Goblins by Minnesota Jewish Theatre Company

Actor Honorees
 Christina Baldwin and Jennifer Baldwin Peden-- Sister Stories, by Nautilus Music- Theater
 Luveme Seifert-- 800 Words: The Transmigration of Phillip Dick, by Workhaus Theatre Collective
 Greta Oglesby -- Caroline or Change by the Guthrie Theater
 Sonja Parks-- No Child by Pillsbury House Theatre

Emerging Artist Award
Emily Gunyou Halaas, Performer

Lifetime Achievement Award
Dudley Riggs

2010

Productions
 Mary’s Wedding, the Jungle Theater
 Ruined, Mixed Blood Theatre 
 Othello, Ten Thousand Things Theater

Individual Honorees
 Aaron Gabriel, Music -- "Madame Majesta’s Miracle Medicine Show", Interact Theater
 Allison Moore, Playwright -- "My Antonia", Illusion Theater
 Joseph Stanley: Scenic Design -- "Mulan, Jr. ", Children’s Theatre Company
 Tulle & Dye: Costumes -- "Beauty & The Beast", Ordway Center for the Performing Arts

Actor Honorees
 Katie Guentzel -- "My Antonia", Illusion Theater
 Regina Marie Williams -- "Ruined", Mixed Blood Theatre

Emerging Artist Award
Kalere Payton, Costume Designer

Lifetime Achievement Award
Wendy Lehr, Actress

2011

Productions
 Doubt, Ten Thousand Things
 The 7-Shot Symphony, Live Action Set

Individual Honorees
 Craig Johnson, Director -- "Street Scene" Girl Friday Productions
 Gary Rue, Music -- "Buddy– The Buddy Holly Story", History Theatre
 David Bolger, Choreographer -- "H.M.S. Pinafore", Guthrie Theater

Actor Honorees
 Peter Christian Hansen -- "Burn This" Gremlin Theatre
 Dennis Spears -- "I Wish You Love" Penumbra Theatre Company
 Ben Bakken -- "Jesus Christ Superstar" Chanhassen Dinner Theatres

Emerging Artist Award
Anna Sundberg, Actress

Lifetime Achievement Award
Bain Boehlke

2012

Productions
 Compleat Female Stage Beauty, Walking Shadow Theatre Company 
 Spring Awakening, Theatre Latte Da
 Ballad of the Pale Fisherman, Illusion Theater 
 Julius Caesar, Theatre Unbound

Individual Honorees
 Barry Browning, Lighting Design --"Dial M for Murder", Jungle Theater
 Miriam Monasch, Directing --"Our Class", Minnesota Jewish Theatre Company
 Joe Vass, Musical Direction --"The Soul of Gershwin: The Musical Journey of an American", Klezme

Actor Honorees
 Tracie Bennett -- "End of the Rainbow", Guthrie Theater
 Hugh Kennedy -- Buzzer", Pillsbury House Theatre
 Jody Briskey -- "Beyond the Rainbow: Garland at Carnegie Hall", History Theatre

Emerging Artist Award
Isabel Nelson, Actress and Artistic Director

Lifetime Achievement Award
Rick Shiomi

2013

Productions
 In the Next Room, Jungle Theater
 Milly & Tillie, Open Eye Figure Theatre

Individual Honorees
 Peter Beard & James Napoleon Stone, Directing-- "Hamlet", Theatre Coup d’Etat
 Raymond Berg, Musical Direction -- "Urinetown: The Musical", Jungle Theater
 Peter Brosius, Directing -- "If You Give a Mouse a Cookie", Children’s Theatre Company
 Michael Croswell, Sound Design -- "Misterman", Frank Theatre
 Ensemble, Acting -- "Clybourne Park", Guthrie Theater
 Ensemble, Acting -- "Two Sugars, Room for Cream", Hennepin Theatre Trust
 Michael Matthew Ferrell, Choreography -- "Singin’ in the Rain", Bloomington Civic Theatre
 Katherine Glover, Alissa M. Shellito & Jeri Weiss, Playwriting -- "Freshwater Theatre Goes Back to High School", Freshwater Theatre Company

Actor Honorees
 Dean Holt, Acting -- "If You Give a Mouse a Cookie", Children’s Theatre Company
 Craig Johnson, Acting -- "Gross Indecency: The Three Trials of Oscar Wilde", Walking Shadow Theatre Company

Emerging Artist Award
Ricardo Vázquez, Actor, Director and Playwright

Lifetime Achievement Award
Jeffrey Hatcher, Playwright

2014

Productions
 Cabaret, Latte Da and Hennepin Theatre Trust
 Ordinary Days'', Nautilus Music-Theater

Individual Honorees
 Ensemble, Intellect and Emotional Intensity -- "Rose", MN Jewish Theatre Company
 Anne Byrd, Directing -- "The 39 Steps", Yellow Tree Theatre
 Ensemble, Acting -- "Driving Miss Daisy", Jungle Theater
 Seraphina Nova, Playwright -- "Dogwood", Candid Theater Company
 Eduardo Sicangco, Set Design/Costumes -- "Cinderella", Children's Theatre Company
 Sandy Spieler and Julie Boada, Properties Design -- "Between the Worlds", Heart of the Beast

Actor Honorees
 Sally Wingert, Acting—Four productions in 2013-14
 Nathan Cousins and Tristan Tifft, Acting -- "The 39 Steps", Yellow Tree Theatre

Emerging Artist Award
Tyler Michaels, Actor

Lifetime Achievement Award
Michael Robins and Bonnie Morris, Co-Producing Directors

References

External links
 Ivey Awards

American theater awards
2004 establishments in Minnesota
2018 disestablishments in Minnesota